Harrison Township is one of ten townships in Daviess County, Indiana. As of the 2010 census, its population was 696 and it contained 308 housing units.

History
Harrison Township was organized in June 1841 out of parts of Reave and Veale townships.  Its first settlers were Lewis and William Jones, who came from South Carolina in 1812 and were soon joined by many other families from the Palmetto State.

The Glendale Ridge Archaeological Site was listed on the National Register of Historic Places in 1985.

Geography

Unincorporated towns
 Glendale
 Hudsonville
 Waco
(This list is based on USGS data and may include former settlements.)

Adjacent townships
 Barr Township (northeast)
 Reeve Township (east)
 Boone Township, Dubois County (southeast)
 Jefferson Township, Pike County (southwest)
 Veale Township (west)
 Washington Township (northwest)

Major highways

Cemeteries
The township contains three cemeteries: East Union, Ebenezer and Saint Patricks Glencoe.

References
 
 United States Census Bureau cartographic boundary files

External links

 Indiana Township Association
 United Township Association of Indiana

Townships in Daviess County, Indiana
Townships in Indiana
1841 establishments in Indiana
Populated places established in 1841